Campania is a township in Tasmania's Coal River Valley, in the Southern Midlands Council.

It is one of the most important wine-producing regions of Tasmania, and has had commercial vineyards since the mid-19th century.

History
Campania developed around a railway station built in 1876 on land that was formerly a section of the Campania Estate owned by James Brock, and contains several historical buildings.

Campania Post Office opened on 15 September 1873.

Demographics
The 2006 Census by the Australian Bureau of Statistics counted 742 persons in Campania on census night. Of these, 51.8% were male and 48.2% were female.

The majority of residents (87.2%) are of Australian birth, with another 4.2% from England.

The age distribution of Campania residents is comparable to that of the greater Australian population. 67.2% of residents were over 25 years in 2006, compared to the Australian average of 66.5%; and 32.8% were younger than 25 years, compared to the Australian average of 33.5%.

Transport
Colebrook Road passes through Campania.

Climate

References

External links
Southern Midlands Council
2006 ABS Census Data by Location

Localities of Southern Midlands Council
Localities of City of Clarence
Towns in Tasmania